PNHS may refer to:
Persons of National Historic Significance
Plainfield North High School, a public high school in Plainfield, Illinois
Portage Northern High School, a public high school in Portage, Michigan
Pretoria North High School, a public high school in Pretoria, South Africa
Punta National High School - Main (Calamba City)
Parañaque National High School